Stratford City Bus Station is located on Montfichet Road, adjacent to the main entrance of Westfield Stratford City. It opened on 13 September 2011 as part of the new shopping centre. An entrance to Stratford station is located adjacent to the entrance to Westfield and the bus station. The main entrance to Stratford station and Stratford bus station located across the link bridge on the other side of the railway.

London Buses routes 97, 108, 241, 308, 339, 388 and night route N205 serve the station.

See also
List of bus and coach stations in London

References

Buildings and structures in the London Borough of Newham
Bus stations in London
Stratford, London
Transport in the London Borough of Newham